KSS Klaipėda was a Lithuanian football club from Klaipėda. It was the most accomplished interbellum football club from Klaipėda.

History 

The "Klaipėdos įgulos ir krašto sporto sąjunga" (English: Klaipėda Crew and Region Sports Union) was founded in 1926. Until the spring of 1939 the club played in Klaipėda, but after the 1939 German ultimatum to Lithuania it was forced to move to Telšiai, with occasional home matches played in Plungė. It was dissolved in 1940.

Name history 
1926 – KSS Klaipėda
1939 – KSS Telšiai

International games

Achievements 
Lithuanian Championship
Winners (6): 1928, 1929, 1930, 1931, 1936–1937, 1937–1938
Runners-up (3): 1926, 1932, 1935
Third places (1): 1938–1939
 Champion of Lithuanian National Olympics (1938)

External links 
Statistics – futbolinis.lt

Defunct football clubs in Lithuania
Football clubs in Klaipėda
1926 establishments in Lithuania
1940 disestablishments in Lithuania
Association football clubs established in 1926
Association football clubs disestablished in 1940